Bikbau (Bikbaw) is a rural locality (a selo) in Bikbausky Selsoviet, Zianchurinsky District, Bashkortostan, Russia. The population was 199 as of 2010. There are 3 streets.

Geography 
Bikbau is located 17 km east of Isyangulovo (the district's administrative centre) by road. Karadygan is the nearest rural locality.

References 

Rural localities in Zianchurinsky District